Esporte Clube Viana, commonly known as Viana, is a Brazilian football club based in Viana, Maranhão state. They competed in the Série C twice.

History
The club was founded on June 15, 1995. They competed in the Série C in 1998, when they reached the Second Stage of the competition. Viana competed again in the Série C in 2003, when they were eliminated in the Second Stage by Imperatriz.

Stadium
Esporte Clube Viana play their home games at Estádio Daniel Filho, nicknamed Danielzinho. The stadium has a maximum capacity of 3,725 people.

References

Association football clubs established in 1995
Football clubs in Maranhão
1995 establishments in Brazil